The 2009 Chatham Cup is New Zealand's 82nd knockout football competition.

The 2009 competition had a preliminary round, a qualification round, and four rounds proper before quarter-finals, semi-finals, and a final. In all, 130 teams took part in the 2009 competition.

The 2009 final
In the final, Three Kings United took an early lead through a third-minute goal from Luiz del Monte. Three Kings dominated for much of the early part of the match, but higher-ranked Olympic fought back, and a header just before the half-hour mark from Mickey Malivuk levelled the scores at 1-1. In the second half Olympic had the upper hand, and eventually took the lead through a 75th-minute penalty taken by Raf de Gregorio. Three Kings attacked strongly during the last few minutes of the match but were unable to produce an equaliser.

The Jack Batty Memorial Cup is awarded to the player adjudged to have made to most positive impact in the Chatham Cup final. The winner of the 2009 Jack Batty Memorial Cup was Raf de Gregorio of Wellington Olympic.

Results

Second round

* Won on penalties by Bohemian Celtic (5-4) and Ferrymead Bays (6-5)

Third round

* Won on penalties by Nelson Suburbs (5-4) and Manurewa (7-6)

Fourth round

Quarter-finals

Semi-finals

Final

References

 2009 in New Zealand football

Chatham Cup
Chatham Cup
Chatham Cup
Chat